Witness to Yesterday is a Canadian docudrama television series which featured staged interviews with historical personalities. It was first broadcast by Global Television Network in 1974 then produced by TVOntario to 1976. A 12-episode revival of the series was produced in 1998 for History Television.

Synopsis
Each episode featured a historical person as portrayed by a guest actor in conversation with host Patrick Watson who took the role of an interviewer.

Witness to Yesterday was among the first series to be broadcast by Global. Original episodes were broadcast on Global in a regular Tuesday 10:00 p.m. time slot from 8 January 1974 to 21 May 1974. The debut episode featured Sandy Dennis as Joan of Arc.

Production
The series was produced in Montreal by Look Hear Productions, a division of the McConnell advertising company.

Laurier Lapierre conducted research for the series. Scripts were written, but the filming often incorporated ad-lib dialogue. Each episode was produced for approximately $6000 with actors paid from $600 to $2500. Host Patrick Watson earned 15% of the international sales income plus his base $500 per episode. Writers included Patrick Watson, Patrick Withrow and Doug Scott.

Global Television Network encountered financial difficulties in its initial months and cancelled most of its original Canadian programming by May 1974. Global owed Look Hear Productions $130,000 for producing 24 episodes of Witness to Yesterday. The last episode filmed prior to Global's cancellation featured Donald Sutherland as doctor Norman Bethune. Global eventually paid 30% of its bill for the series as part of its financial settlement with creditors.

CBC Television considered picking up the series but by then had booked other productions. Witness to Yesterday was transferred to Toronto educational station CICA-TV (OECA) which planned the production of three new episodes for the 1974–75 season and another 13 for the 1975–76 season, in addition to rebroadcasting the initial 20 episodes.

Episodes

Global Television Network episodes (1974) 

Global broadcast the series on a regular 10 p.m. Tuesday time slot.

CICA/TVOntario episodes (1974–1976)

Reception
Witness to Yesterday was sold to broadcasters in Australia, New Zealand, the United Kingdom and on other Canadian stations.

Blaik Kirby of The Globe and Mail deemed the premiere to be "flat and undramatic", noting that French-Canadian actress Geneviève Bujold should have been considered for the role of Joan of Arc over the less appropriate performance from American Sandy Dennis. Later, Kirby gave the overall series a favourable review, noting that it "was in almost everyone's opinion, one of the very best of Global's Canadian programs, which were a worthy achievement even as a group."

1998 revival

New episodes of Witness to Yesterday were broadcast by History Television in 1998. Watson again hosted the series and was its primary writer with additional writing by Hugh Graham. 12 episodes were completed of a 13-episode plan under a $700,000 budget. Eight episodes were recorded in December 1997 at St. Thomas University in Fredericton. The remaining episodes were recorded in Toronto. Alan Gough directed this series revival with Watson. New Brunswick company Cinefile and Toronto's The Film Works co-produced the series revival. Victor Solnicki and Barry Cameron were executive producers from Cinefile and The Film Works respectively. Its budget was supported by History Television, PBS which aired these episodes and a $168,500 credit from provincial agency Film NB.

History Television episodes (1998)

See also
Titans (Canadian TV series), a similar series (1981–1982) in which Watson also starred
Meeting of Minds, a similar series created by Steve Allen in the late 1950s, aired locally to critical acclaim in 1971 and nationally on PBS from 1977 to 1981.  Allen appeared on a 1976 episode of Witness to Yesterday as George Gershwin.

References

External links
  (1974–76)
  (1998)
 

1970s Canadian drama television series
Canadian television docudramas
Culture of Fredericton
Global Television Network original programming
History (Canadian TV network) original programming
Television shows filmed in New Brunswick
TVO original programming
1974 Canadian television series debuts
1976 Canadian television series endings
1998 Canadian television series debuts
1998 Canadian television series endings
1990s Canadian drama television series